Algodu  is a village in the southern state of Karnataka, India. It is located in the Tirumakudal Narsipur taluk of Mysore district.

Demographics
 India census, Algodu had a population of 5951 with 3001 males and 2950 females.

See also
 Mysore
 Districts of Karnataka

References

External links

Villages in Mysore district